Downfield Crossing Halt was on what is now the Golden Valley Line between  and .

History

The halt was between Stroud and Stonehouse, and originally consisted of a pair of ground level platforms, but was these subsequently replaced by standard height platforms along with GWR pagoda style shelters, . The platforms were later reconstructed with brick. Access to the halt was from the adjacent level crossing.

Closure of the halt came on 2 November 1964 following the withdrawal of local stopping passenger services on the line. No trace of the halt remains today.

Services
This halt was served by the Gloucester to  local passenger services, known as the 'Chalford Auto'.

Notes

References

External links
Downfield Crossing Halt on navigable 1946 O.S. map

Stroud District
Disused railway stations in Gloucestershire
Former Great Western Railway stations
Railway stations in Great Britain opened in 1903
Railway stations in Great Britain closed in 1964
Beeching closures in England
1903 establishments in England
1964 disestablishments in England